14-3-3 protein beta/alpha is a protein that in humans is encoded by the YWHAB gene.

Function 

This gene encodes a protein belonging to the 14-3-3 family of proteins, members of which mediate signal transduction by binding to phosphoserine-containing proteins. This highly conserved protein family is found in both plants and mammals. The encoded protein has been shown to interact with RAF1 and CDC25 phosphatases, suggesting that it may play a role in linking mitogenic signaling and the cell cycle machinery. Two transcript variants, which encode the same protein, have been identified for this gene.

Interactions
YWHAB has been shown to interact with:

 BRAF, 
 C-Raf, 
 CD29, 
 CDC25A, 
 CDC25B, 
 Cbl gene, 
 EPB41L3, 
 HDAC4 
 KCNK3,
 MAPK7, 
 PTPN3, 
 PRKCZ, 
 RPS6KA1, 
 TESK1, 
 TNFAIP3,  and
 WEE1.

See also
14-3-3 proteins

References

Further reading

14-3-3 proteins